Dame Irene Vanbrugh DBE ( Barnes; 2 December 1872 – 30 November 1949) was an English actress. The daughter of a clergyman, Vanbrugh followed her elder sister Violet into the theatrical profession and sustained a career for more than 50 years.

In her early days as a leading lady she was particularly associated with the plays of Arthur Wing Pinero and later had parts written for her by J. M. Barrie, Bernard Shaw, Somerset Maugham, A. A. Milne and Noël Coward. More famous for comic rather than dramatic roles, Vanbrugh nevertheless played a number of the latter in both modern works and the classics. Her stage debut was in Shakespeare, but she seldom acted in his works later in her career; exceptions were her Queen Gertrude in Hamlet in 1931 and her Meg Page in The Merry Wives of Windsor, opposite her sister Violet as Alice Ford, in 1937.

Vanbrugh appeared frequently in fundraising shows for various charities. She was active over many years in the support of the Royal Academy of Dramatic Art in London, of which her brother was principal. After her death the Academy's new theatre was named The Vanbrugh Theatre in honour of her and her sister. She was also a governor of the Elizabeth Garrett Anderson Hospital on Euston Road and in June 1918 she organised a matinee concert at the London Palladium to raise funds for the endowment of a bed for the use of any woman connected to the theatrical profession.

Biography

Early years
Vanbrugh was born Irene Barnes in Exeter, the youngest daughter and fifth child of six of the Rev. Reginald Henry Barnes (1831–1889), Prebendary of Exeter Cathedral and Vicar of Heavitree, and his wife, Frances Mary Emily, née Nation. Irene's eldest sister Violet and younger brother Kenneth were also to make theatrical careers. Another sister Edith married, as his second wife, Hugh Shakespear Barnes, an official in the colonial service and became a pillar of the British Raj, and Angela was a professional violinist. Irene was educated at Exeter High School and at schools in Paris. When the Barnes family moved to London, she attended a school near Earls Court recommended by the actress Ellen Terry, a family friend.

It was also at Terry's suggestion that Violet, on starting a theatrical career, had adopted the stage name Vanbrugh. Irene did the same. Violet's early success encouraged Irene to follow her into the theatrical profession. Sir John Gielgud described the two:The Vanbrugh sisters were remarkably alike in appearance. Tall and imposing, beautifully spoken, they moved with grace ... They were elegantly but never ostentatiously dressed, entering and leaving the stage with unerring authority ... Violet never struck me as a natural comedienne, as Irene was.

As her elder sister had done, Irene enrolled at Sarah Thorne's school of acting, based at Margate, which gave her a thorough practical grounding. She recalled, "We played every kind of play there; comedy, farce, and drama of the deepest dye; while at Christmas there came the pantomime, so that the Juliet of a week ago might be the Prince Paragon of the Yule-tide extravaganza." As a student at the school, her first appearance on stage was in August 1888, as the capricious shepherdess Phoebe in As You Like It at the Theatre Royal, Margate, opposite the Rosalind of her sister Violet.

Early roles
Lewis Carroll, a college friend of Vanbrugh's father, saw her performing in Margate and was impressed. On his recommendation she made her London début in December 1888, playing the White Queen and the Knave of Hearts in a revival of Alice in Wonderland at the old Globe Theatre. Her sister Edith joined her in this production. Violet's early theatrical engagements had been with J. L. Toole, and Irene emulated her and joined his company. For Toole, she played in established comedy successes including Dion Boucicault's Dot and H. J. Byron's Uncle Dick's Darling.

When Toole toured Australia in 1890, Vanbrugh was a member of his company, acting in every play in its repertoire. She later commented, "I think this was even better training than Miss Thorne's school; not only was I constantly playing a new part, but I was constantly playing to a different type of audience. We visited all sorts of Australian cities, large and small, and one was pretty certain before long to find out the weak points in one's method." On her return, she remained with Toole's company, and played her first original roles as Thea Tesman in James Barrie's, burlesque Ibsen's Ghost (1891), and as Bell Golightly in Barrie's Walker, London (1892).

In 1893, Vanbrugh joined Herbert Beerbohm Tree at the Haymarket Theatre as Lettice in The Tempter (1893) by Henry Arthur Jones. The play was not popular and was soon taken off, but she had more success in Jones's next play, The Masqueraders, and in 1894 she was engaged by George Alexander at the St James's Theatre where she played a number of secondary parts, and in 1895 created the role of Gwendolen Fairfax in The Importance of Being Earnest.

When Arthur Bourchier, who had married Violet Vanbrugh, launched himself as an actor-manager, Vanbrugh joined them at the Royalty Theatre, winning good notices in The Chili Widow and in the title role of the comedy Kitty Clive. She went with the Bourchier company to America, and on her return in 1898 she created Rose in Trelawny of the Wells by Arthur Pinero, and, during the same season, Stella in Robert Marshall's His Excellency the Governor. After a short break she then played the role that made her name, Sophy Fullgarney in Pinero's The Gay Lord Quex (1899). This part, a little Cockney manicurist, was quite different from any she had played before, but Pinero was insistent that she should play it. In the words of the biographer S. R. Littlewood, "Vanbrugh's intelligence, sympathy, and alertness avoided extravagance in a subtle expression of class-contrast. This gave the character an intensity of appeal that was at the time something quite new." The play was regarded as risqué, and one critic commented that had Lewis Carroll still been alive, he would have approved of "Miss Vanbrugh's greatest triumph," but probably not of the play.

Early 20th century

In 1901 Vanbrugh married the actor Dion Boucicault Jr., son of his more famous namesake. They frequently appeared together for the rest of his life, and he became her manager in 1915. There were no children of the marriage. Between the turn of the century and World War I she had leading roles in new plays by J. M. Barrie (The Admirable Crichton, 1902; and Rosalind, 1912), Pinero (Letty, 1903; His House in Order, 1906; and Mid-Channel, 1909), and Maugham (Grace, 1910; and The Land of Promise, 1914). She also starred in new plays by Charles Haddon Chambers (Passers-By, 1911), and A. E. W. Mason (Open Windows, 1913). In 1913 she played Lady Gay Spanker in a revival of Boucicault senior's London Assurance in an all-star cast including Tree, Charles Hawtrey, Bourchier, Weedon Grossmith and Marie Tempest. This was one of the many charity fund-raising productions in which Vanbrugh appeared throughout her career.

During World War I, Vanbrugh took a succession of leading roles in the West End, beginning with The Spirit of Culture in Barrie's war play Der Tag (1914). Following this, she played Lady Falkland in The Right to Kill (1915); the title role in Caroline (1916); Mrs Lytton in The Riddle (1916); Emily Ladew in Her Husband's Wife (1916); Leonora in Barrie's Seven Women (1917); and the title role in A. A. Milne's Belinda (1918). In 1916, she appeared in her first film, The Real Thing at Last (1916); the following year she made a silent film version of The Gay Lord Quex, as Sophy Fullgarney.

Inter-war years
From its early days, Vanbrugh was closely connected with the Royal Academy of Dramatic Art (RADA). Her younger brother, Kenneth Barnes, had been its principal since 1909. In 1919, to raise funds for the Academy's theatre, then under construction, she had the play Masks and Faces filmed with a star cast, including not only leading actors but the playwrights Shaw, Pinero and Barrie in cameo appearances.

Vanbrugh's first big stage success of the post-war years was in Milne's Mr Pim Passes By in 1920. She and her husband opened it in Manchester, and such was its reception that they brought it into the West End. From 1927 to 1929, she toured Australia and New Zealand, playing a variety of parts. Her other appearances in the inter-war years included Gertrude to Henry Ainley's Hamlet in 1931, Millicent Jordan in Dinner at Eight (1933), the Duchess of Marlborough in Viceroy Sarah, (1935) and Mistress Page in The Merry Wives of Windsor with her sister Violet as Mistress Ford (1937). In 1939, she created the role of Catherine of Braganza in Shaw's In Good King Charles's Golden Days.

Vanbrugh appeared in ten talkies from 1933 to 1945: Head of the Family; Catherine the Great; Girls Will Be Boys; The Way of Youth; Youthful Folly; Escape Me Never; Wings of the Morning; Knight Without Armour; It Happened One Sunday; and I Live in Grosvenor Square.

In 1938, during the run of Noël Coward's Operette, in which she played Lady Messiter, Vanbrugh celebrated her golden jubilee as an actress. It was celebrated at a gala charity matinée attended by the Queen at His Majesty's Theatre; Violet Vanbrugh, Coward, Edith Evans, Gladys Cooper, Seymour Hicks and many other leading performers took part.

Later years
During the Battle of Britain, the Vanbrugh sisters carried out what Littlewood calls "a characteristic piece of war work" by giving, with Donald Wolfit, lunchtime performances of extracts from The Merry Wives of Windsor at the Strand Theatre. Throughout the war, Vanbrugh appeared in the West End and on tour in new plays, revivals of her earlier successes, and classics. Almost 50 years after her first appearance in a Wilde play, she played Lady Markby in An Ideal Husband in 1943–1944, giving a performance characterised by The Times as "comic perfection". Vanbrugh appeared as Mrs. Mildred Catchpole in the 1945 film I Live in Grosvenor Square, a British romance directed and produced by Herbert Wilcox. Her co-stars were Dean Jagger and Rex Harrison. 

Vanbrugh was working to the end of her life. In November 1949, she appeared in Mary Bonaventure in its pre-London run in Birmingham, but she was taken ill before the London opening and died within days, several days before her 77th birthday.

Honours and commemorations
Vanbrugh was created a Dame Commander of the Order of the British Empire (DBE) in 1941. After her death, the new theatre for the Royal Academy of Dramatic Art was named the Vanbrugh Theatre in honour of Vanbrugh and her sister. Located in Gower Street, London, the theatre was opened in 1954 by Queen Elizabeth the Queen Mother.

At a matinée marking RADA's golden jubilee in 1954, in the presence of Irene Vanbrugh's brother, Sir Kenneth Barnes, who was still the principal of the Academy, Edith Evans read a poem by A. P. Herbert in which Vanbrugh was celebrated among the leading names of British theatre:
All the great names that give our past a glow,
Bancroft and Irving, Barrie and Boucicault,
Vanbrugh and Playfair, Terry, Kendal, Maude,
Gilbert and Grossmith loudly we applaud.

See also
RADA

Notes and references
Notes

References

Sources

External links

 Biography on Theatrical Guild
 Performance details from the theatrical archive, University of Bristol
 Biographical information from collectorspost.com

Further reading

1872 births
1949 deaths
19th-century English actresses
Actresses awarded damehoods
Dames Commander of the Order of the British Empire
English film actresses
English silent film actresses
English stage actresses
Actors from Exeter
20th-century English actresses
Actresses from Devon